The history of Brunei concerns the settlements and societies located on the north coast of the island of Borneo, which has been under the influence of Indianised kingdoms and empires for much of its history. Local scholars assume that the Islamisation of Brunei started in the fifteenth century, with the formation of the Bruneian Empire, a thalassocracy which covered the northern part of Borneo and the southern Philippines. At the end of the 17th century, Brunei subsequently entered a period of decline brought on by Brunei Civil War, piracy, and European colonial expansion. Later, there was a brief war with Spain, in which Brunei lost Manila and evacuated their capital for a brief period until the Spanish withdrew. The empire lost much of its territory with the arrival of the Western powers, such as the Spanish in the Philippines and the British in Labuan, Sarawak, and North Borneo. The decline of the Bruneian Empire accelerated in the nineteenth century when Brunei gave much of its territory to the White Rajahs of Sarawak, resulting in its current small landmass and separation into two parts. Sultan Hashim Jalilul Alam Aqamaddin later appealed to the British to stop further annexation in 1888. In the same year, the British signed a "Treaty of Protection" and made Brunei a British protectorate until 1984 when it gained independence and prospered due to the discovery of oil.

Pre-Islamic Hindu-Buddhist Indianised kingdoms 

The history of Brunei before the arrival of Magellan's ships in 1519-1522 CE is based on speculation, the interpretation of Chinese sources, and local legends, unless otherwise proven by archaeology. Areas comprising what is now Brunei participated in the Maritime Jade Road, as ascertained by archeological research. The trading network existed for 3,000 years, between 2000 BC to 1000 AD, and was centered in Taiwan and the Philippines. Excavations unearthed at Sungai Limau Manis located approximately 22km from Brunei capital Bandar Seri Begawan suggest that the Chinese may have traded in the area as early as 835 AD.

Camphor and pepper seem to have been prized objects of trade. Brunei hard camphor had a wholesale value equivalent to its own weight in silver. Ming dynasty accounts give detailed information about visits and tribute missions by rulers of Po-ni (transliteration of Bumi) during the late 14th and early 15th century. Their names and titles suggest either Hindu or Buddhist influence. The texts confirm that the state was tributary to the Hindu Javanese Majapahit Empire, but sought and received Chinese protection in 1408.

The Arabic author Al Ya'akubi writing in 800 recorded that the kingdom of Musa (which might have been old Brunei) was in alliance with the kingdom of Mayd (Either Ma-i or Madja-as in the Philippines), against the Chinese Empire which they waged war against.

Sribuza and Madja-as 
The settlement known as Vijayapura was a vassal-state to the Buddhist Srivijaya empire and was thought to be located in Borneo's Northwest which flourished in the 7th century. This alternate Srivijaya referring to Brunei, was known to Arabic sources as "Sribuza".

In the aftermath of the Indian Chola invasion of Srivijaya, Datu Puti lead some dissident datus from Sumatra and Borneo in a rebellion against Rajah Makatunao who was a Chola appointed local Rajah or the descendant of Seri Maharajah (In Chinese records). The dissidents and their retinue tried to revive Srivijaya in a new country called Madja-as in the Visayas islands (an archipelago named after Srivijaya) in the Philippines. After the 10 Datus established many towns in Panay and Southern Luzon, according to Augustinian Friar Rev. Fr. Santaren recording in the Spanish era of this Pre-Spanish legendary history, that Datu Macatunao or Rajah Makatunao who was the "sultan of the Moros," and a relative of Datu Puti who seized the properties and riches of the ten datus was eventually killed by the warriors named Labaodungon and Paybare, after learning of this injustice from their father-in-law Paiburong, sailed to Odtojan in Borneo where Makatunaw ruled. The warriors sacked the city, killed Makatunaw and his family, retrieved the stolen properties of the 10 datus, enslaved the remaining population of Odtojan, and sailed back to Panay. Labaw Donggon and his wife, Ojaytanayon, later settled in a place called Moroboro.

Syair Awang Semaun epic 

According to the official version of events, mainly the national epic poem Syair Awang Semaun, Brunei was founded by a band of fourteen saudara (brothers and first cousins), who eventually settled in the Brunei river near the present capital and chose one of their number as the first ruler. Some known versions of the epic states that they were all the sons of Dewa Amas of Kayangan, a part supernatural being who descended to earth at Ulu Limbang in an egg. Many Lundayeh / Lun Bawang believe that Awang Semaun is  their ancestors grassroot because of Telur Aco.

Discovered by the Sang Aji, he was married to that ruler's daughter by whom he fathered one son. He travelled to thirteen settlements in the region in search of an auspicious ox. At each of the villages, he fathered thirteen (or twenty-two) other sons by thirteen different aboriginal wives, daughters of the local penghulu.

The first ruler chosen by the saudara to rule the newly founded state was Awang Alak Betatar, the son of Dewa Amas and the Sang Aji's daughter. He was not necessarily the eldest among them, but chosen to rule because of his fitness to do so. The official account states that he journeyed to Johor, embraced Islam, married the daughter of a Sultan "Bahkei" of Johor and received the title of Sultan Muhammad Shah from him.

Brunei in the 14th century

Early Chinese influence 
The largest river in the territory, the Cina Batangan, was believed to be named by earlier Chinese settlers which had a factory to collect birds nests, beche-de-mer, shark fins, Borneon camphor, pearl and pearl-shells for export to China. The productions of North and Northeast Borneo from early times attracted considerable attention from the Chinese.

One of the earliest Chinese records of an independent kingdom in Borneo is the 977 AD letter to the Chinese emperor from the ruler of Boni, which some scholars believe to refer to Borneo. The Bruneians regained their independence from Srivijaya due to the onset of a Javanese-Sumatran war. In 1225, the Chinese official Zhao Rukuo reported that Boni had 100 warships to protect its trade, and that there was great wealth in the kingdom. Marco Polo suggested in his memoirs that the Great Khan or the ruler of the Mongol Empire, attempted and failed many times in invading "Great Java" which was the European name for Bruneian controlled Borneo.

During the early years of Ming Dynasty, Emperor of China had sent two officers named Wang Kong and Ong Sum Ping to get the gemala (glowing orb) of the Dragon which lived on China Balu where the mountain name itself refers to the great number of Chinese lives lost being eaten by the Dragon. The Brunei History Centre presents a rather incredible story in which Ong Sum Ping later married Princess Ratna Dewi, the daughter of Sultan Muhammad Shah of Brunei. For that he was conferred the nobility title of Pengiran Maharaja Lela and elected Chief of Kinabatangan.

When the admiral Zheng He visited the Brunei in the early 15th century, he encountered a major trading port which included Chinese people who were actively trading with China.

Bruneian conquest of Borneo and the Philippines 
Marco Polo wrote in his memoirs that the Great Khan or the ruler of the Mongol Empire, attempted and failed many times in invading "Great Java" which was the European name for Bruneian controlled Borneo. In the 1300s the Chinese annals, Nanhai zhi, reported that Brunei invaded or administered Sarawak and Sabah as well as the Philippine kingdoms of: Butuan, Sulu, Ma-i (Mindoro), Malilu (present-day Manila), Shahuchong (present-day Siocon or Zamboanga), Yachen (Oton, once part of the Madja-as Kedatuan), and Wenduling (present-day Mindanao), which would regain their independence at a later date. It eventually evolved to be called Pon-i and it was a vassal-state to the Javanese-centered Majapahit Empire.

Hindu Majapahit invasion of Borneo 
In the 14th century, the Javanese manuscript Nagarakretagama, written by Prapanca in 1365, mentioned Barune as the constituent state of Hindu Majapahit, which had to make an annual tribute of 40 katis of camphor. In 1369, Sulu which was also formerly part of Majapahit, had successfully rebelled and then attacked Boni, and had invaded the Northeast Coast of Borneo and afterwards had looted the capital of its treasure and gold including sacking two sacred pearls. A fleet from Majapahit succeeded in driving away the Sulus, but Boni was left weaker after the attack. A Chinese report from 1371 described Boni as poor and totally controlled by Majapahit.

Islamization and establishment of the sultanate 

By the 15th century, the empire became a Muslim state, when the King of Brunei, declared independence from Majapahit and converted to Islam, brought by Muslim Indians and Arab merchants from other parts of Maritime Southeast Asia, who came to trade and spread Islam. During the rule of Bolkiah, the fifth Sultan, the empire controlled the coastal areas of northwest Borneo (present-day Brunei, Sarawak and Sabah) and reached the Philippines at Seludong (present-day Manila), Sulu Archipelago and included parts of the island of Mindanao which Brunei incorporated via royal intermarriage with the rulers of Sulu, Manila and Maguindanao. In the 16th century, the Brunei empire's influence also extended as far as Kapuas River delta in West Kalimantan.

Other sultanates in the area had close relations with the Royal House of Brunei, being in some cases effectively under the hegemony of the Brunei ruling family for periods of time, such as the Malay sultans of Pontianak, Samarinda and as far as Banjarmasin who treated the Sultan of Brunei as their leader. The Malay Sultanate of Sambas in present-day West Kalimantan and Sultanate of Sulu in Southern Philippines in particular, and even the Muslim Rajahs of precolonial Manila had developed dynastic relations with the royal house of Brunei.  The Sultanate of Sarawak (covering present day Kuching, known to the Portuguese cartographers as Cerava, and one of the five great seaports on the island of Borneo), though under the influence of the Brunei, was self-governed under Sultan Tengah before being fully integrated into the Bruneian Empire upon the Tengah's death in 1641.

Relations with Europeans 
Brunei's relations varied with the different European powers in the region.  The Portuguese, for the most part, were more interested in economic and trading relations with the regional powers and did little to interfere with Brunei's development.  This does not mean that relations were always cordial, such as in 1536 when the Portuguese attacked the Muslims in the Moluccas and the ambassador to the Brunei court had to leave because of the sultan's hostility.  The Portuguese also noted that the sultanate was heavily involved in the region's politics and wars, and that Brunei merchants could be found in Ligor and Siam.

Conflict with the Spanish Empire 
Relations with Spain were far more hostile.  From 1565 on, Spanish and Brunei forces engaged in a number of naval skirmishes, and in 1571 the Spanish who had been sending expeditions from Mexico succeeded in capturing Manila from the Brunei aristocracy that had been established there.  Brunei raised several large fleets with the intention of recapturing the city, but the campaigns, for various reasons, never launched. In 1578, the Spanish took Sulu and in April attacked and captured Brunei itself, after demanding that the sultan cease proselytising in the Philippines and, in turn, allow Christian missionaries to be active in his kingdom. The Spaniards withdrew after suffering heavy losses due to a cholera or dysentery outbreak. They were so weakened by the illness that they decided to abandon Brunei to return to Manila on 26 June 1578, after just 72 days. The short-term damage to the sultanate was minimal, as Sulu regained its independence soon after. However, Brunei failed to regain a foothold in Luzon, with the island firmly in Spanish hands. The Bruneians in their war against Spain, were supported by Lascars and the Ottoman Caliphate. The Spanish were aware of this and complained to their king how Turks and even Granadans (From the Emirate of Granada) assisted Borneans in their war against Spain. Muslim migration from the Ottoman Caliphate, Egypt, Mecca and Arabia was so constant Melchor Davalos complained to the Spanish King of their presence in Borneo and the Philippines.

To counteract Ottoman assistance to the Bruneians, Spain levied soldiers from their vassal states in Peru and Mexico, to supplement the Spanish troops sent to the Philippines. However, eventually, the Bruneian-Spanish conflict died down.

The long-term effects of regional changes could not be avoided.  After Sultan Hassan, Brunei entered a period of decline, due to internal battles over royal succession as well as the rising influences of European colonial powers in the region, that, among other things, disrupted traditional trading patterns, destroying the economic base of Brunei and many other Southeast Asian sultanates.

Modern period

Relationship with the British and Sarawak 

During Sultan Omar Ali Saifuddin II's reign, disturbances occurred in Sarawak. In 1839, the British adventurer James Brooke arrived in Borneo and helped the Sultan put down this rebellion.

As a reward, he became governor and later "White Rajah" of Sarawak and gradually expanded the territory under his control. Brooke never gained control of Brunei, though he did attempt to. He asked the British to check whether or not it would be acceptable for him to claim Brunei as his own; however, they came back with bad news—although Brunei was poorly governed, it had a definite sense of national identity and could therefore not be absorbed by Brooke.

In 1843 an open conflict between Brooke and the Sultan ended in the latter's defeat. The Sultan recognised Sarawak's independence. In 1846, Brunei Town was attacked and captured by the British and Sultan Saifuddin II was forced to sign a treaty to end the British occupation of Brunei Town. In the same year, Sultan Saifuddin II ceded Labuan to the British under the Treaty of Labuan. In 1847, he signed the Treaty of Friendship and Commerce with the British and in 1850, he signed a similar treaty with the United States, which, after a series of events, resulted in the first consul of the US, Charles Lee Moses, burning down his consulate. Over the years, the Sultans of Brunei ceded further stretches of territory to Sarawak; in 1877, stretches to the east of the capital were leased (later ceded) to the British North Borneo Chartered Company (North Borneo). Eventually, due to these seizures of territory, which was accepted by the sultan for annual lease payments, the British occupied the vast majority of the coast of Brunei. The Sultan only stopped handing over territory when Sarawak asked for Limbang, which the Sultan refused. Against the Sultan's wishes, Sarawak obtained control over the territory.

In 1906, the British started a residency in Brunei. This was averted from greater British control from a friendly report by Malcolm Stewart Hannibal McArthur, who prevented the nation from being colonized completely, in the Report on Brunei in 1904. This residency, with the Sultan having control over internal policies, continued until 1984. During this residency, oil was discovered, in 1928, by Shell. This is what has changed the country from its former impoverished state to a much wealthier one today.

Prior to independence 
The Sultan of Brunei participated in efforts to form a federation of Malaysia with the Federation of Malaya, Crown Colony of Sarawak, Crown Colony of North Borneo and the Colony of Singapore, but decided not to in the end due to the issue of oil profits and massive popular opinion against the move. This wish by the sultan resulted in a coup by the most populous party in the nation, comprising a vast majority of the population, by the Brunei People's Party (PRB). This failed due to poor organisation and their leader, A.M. Azahari, not even being in the country during the coup. Another option considered was a federation between North Borneo, Sarawak, and Brunei, but this was rejected due to oil revenues and the possible limitation of the Sultan's power.

Independence 
On 14 November 1971, Sultan Hassanal Bolkiah left for London to discuss matters regarding the amendments to the 1959 constitution. A new agreement was signed on 23 November 1971 with the British representative being Anthony Royle.

Under this agreement, the following terms were agreed upon:

 Brunei was granted full internal self-government
 The UK would still be responsible for external affairs and defence.
 Brunei and the UK agreed to share the responsibility for security and defence.

This agreement also caused Gurkha units to be deployed in Brunei, where they remain up to this day.

On 7 January 1979, another treaty was signed between Brunei and the UK. It was signed with Lord Goronwy-Roberts being the representative of the UK. This agreement granted Brunei to take over international responsibilities as an independent nation. Britain agreed to assist Brunei in diplomatic matters. In May 1983, it was announced by the UK that the date of independence of Brunei would be 1 January 1984.

On 31 December 1983, a mass gathering was held on main mosques on all four of the districts of the country and at midnight, on 1 January 1984, the Proclamation of Independence was read by Sultan Hassanal Bolkiah. The sultan subsequently assumed the title "His Majesty", rather than the previous "His Royal Highness". Brunei was admitted to the United Nations on 22 September 1984, becoming the organisation's 159th member.

Brunei maintains cordial relations with Malaysia
and the Philippines.

After independence 
Brunei gained its independence from the United Kingdom on 1 January 1984, joining ASEAN on the same year. Economic growth from its extensive petroleum and natural gas fields during the 1990s and 2000s, with the GDP increasing 56% from 1999 to 2008, transformed Brunei into an industrialised country. Brunei has the second-highest Human Development Index among the Southeast Asian  nations, after Singapore, and is classified as a "developed country". In 2014, the Sultan instituted an Islamic Sharia penal code.

See also 

 Brunei Civil War
 List of Sultans of Brunei
 History of Southeast Asia
 History of Asia

Notes

References

Sources

Primary source 
 The Philippine Islands: Explorations by Early Navigators, Descriptions of the Islands and their People, their History and Records of the Catholics Missions, as related in contemporaneous Books and Manuscripts. Vol. IV: 1576–1582. Eds. Emma Helen Blair and James Alexander Robertson. Cleveland: The Arthur H. Clark Company, 1903.

Secondary sources 
 Ongkili, James P. "Ancient Chinese Trading Links." East Malaysia and Brunei. Ed. Wendy Hutton. Tuttle Publishing, 2001.
 Wright, Leigh. "Brunei: An Historical Relic." Journal of the Hong Kong Branch of the Royal Asiatic Society. Vol. 17 (1977).

External links
 Maps of the historic development of Brunei